Eeswaran is a 2021 Indian Tamil-language action drama film written and directed by Suseenthiran, and produced by Balaji Kapa under banners Madhav Media. It stars Silambarsan, Bharathiraja, Nidhhi Agerwal marking the debut in Tamil cinema and Nandita Swetha. The film has music scored by Thaman S, whereas cinematography and editing were handled by Tirru and Anthony respectively.

Principal photography commenced on Dindigul in October 2020, and wrapped up within a single schedule of 22 days. The film released on 14 January 2021, coinciding with Pongal. The film received mixed reviews from critics and was an average success.

Plot

Periyasamy is a farmer who leads a simple and happy life with his wife Paapathi, and their children. One day, the family astrologer Kaali visits Periyasamy's family and makes accurate predictions about their past and future. Periyasamy's world turns upside down the very same day, because just as Kaali had predicted, Paapathi slips and injures her head, and succumbs to her injuries. Years go by, Periyasamy's children get married and move to Chennai for their livelihood leaving him alone in the village. He eagerly awaits his family's occasional visits.

A young man, Eeswaran, joins as a house help/ foster son for Periyasamy. Eeswaran is street smart, wise and runs from pillar to post to get things done, all the while establishing connections with many VIP's in the state. In March 2020, the entire country goes into lockdown due to the COVID-19 pandemic in India, and Periyasamy's family decides to move to the village rather than being stuck in the city. Periyasamy is overjoyed at the idea of spending more time with his grandchildren, So he calls astrologer Kaali, who predicts that there would certainly be a death in the next few days, leaving them worried about contracting the coronavirus and dying from the complications. The whole family takes PCR tests and to their relief, the results come back as negative. However, the doctor informs Eeswaran about Periyasamy's young granddaughter Diya's rare heart condition which requires immediate attention. Eeswaran arranges for Diya's surgery without the family's knowledge, in order to keep them calm and happy.

Meanwhile, Eeswaran's married ex-girlfriend and Periyasamy's granddaughter Vasuki, also comes to stay with them in the lockdown and this causes tension between the two. Vasuki and Eeswaran fell in love, but they broke up when Eeswaran refused to leave the village for the sake of Periyasamy. Vasuki's younger sister Poongodi falls in love with Eeswaran, but he doesn't reciprocate her feelings for the same reason, that he doesn't want to leave Periyasamy alone. Periyasamy understands this situation and confesses to Eeswaran about how he lost the one true love of his life, Parvathi. He says that he had married Paapathi due to his mother's wish, but Parvathi came back into his life once again. He had no choice but to marry her as his second wife and they had a son, Aadhisivan. But things go awry when Paapathi came to know of Parvathi and Periyasamy's relationship. So, Parvathi took Aadhisivan and disappeared for good, Periyasamy doesn't know their whereabouts until date. He urges Eeswaran to accept Poongodi's proposal, Eeswaran obliges.

Periyasamy's daughter and son-in-law Maragadhamani's business keeps incurring losses and he gets loans from his wife's brothers but fails to repay them, leading to family feuds. Maragadhamani asks Periyasamy to sell the family owned land and help him in his business, but Periyasamy vehemently refuses. So, Maragadhamani plans to kill Periyasamy in order to usurp the family property. He sends poisonous snakes into Periyasamy's farm, Eeswaran discovers the plan and saves the family, but gets bitten. He thrashes Maragadhamani, but the family throws Eeswaran out, citing that he is an outsider. Seeing the commotion, Diya faints and the whole family tries to rush her to the hospital for surgery. But they are stopped by Rathnaswamy, Periyasamy's arch-nemesis who was just released from jail. Rathnaswamy wants revenge against Periyasamy as he believes that the latter was the root cause of the suicide of his wife and daughter. Eeswaran rescues the family once again from Rathnaswamy despite the snake poison affecting his body. Finally, he rushes to see Diya, where he collapses and is taken for emergency treatment. Amidst all the confusion, Sonamuthu, a close aide of Periyasamy and Kutty Puli, Eeswaran's friend, explain that Eeswaran is none other than Periyasamy and Parvathi's son Aadhisivan and the truth was hidden as a dying wish from Parvathi. Periyasamy and the whole family are overwhelmed hearing this and rush in to see him. Eeswaran recovers from the snake bite and Diya's surgery also is successful and the whole family is happily reunited.

Eeswaran gets married to Poongodi, he solves Maragadhamani's loan problems and asks him to do proper money management. He gets a call informing him about the sudden demise of astrologer Kaali, indicating that Kaali's predictions came true in some form.

Cast

Production

Development 
In August 2020, Silambarasan was reported to be a part of Suseethiran's untitled film. A source claimed that Simbu had read the script through a virtual meeting with the director, due to the COVID-19 lockdown, and expected to shoot the film in October 2020, during the fifth phase of unlock. Producer Balaji Kapa of Madhav Media, stated an official announcement of their colloaboration with the director and actor on 10 October 2020. Silambarasan released the first look of the film on 26 October 2020, in which the title was revealed to be Eeswaran.

Casting 
The film's cast members had Bharathiraja signing to act as father of Silambarasan. Bala Saravanan signed to appear in a comical role, and Nidhi Agerwal playing the female lead. Thaman S was roped in to compose music, whilst cinematographer Tirru, editor Anthony and art director Rajeevan, were also a part of the technical crew.

For his role in the film, Silambarasan took an extremely intense weight training and strict diet regime, under his trainer Sandeep Raj, in which he lost 30 kilograms in the process. He also indulged in sports, yoga and Bharathanatyam, as a part of the fitness regime. He learnt Bharathanatyam from former actress Saranya Mohan, for few sequences.

Filming 
The principal photography commenced on 17 September 2020, the very same day of the launch. The production team adhered to the safety guidelines, imposed by the government in order to control the spread of COVID-19. Primarily shot at Dindigul, the principal shoot was wrapped up on 7 November 2020, Simbu also completed the dubbing portions of the film on a single day.

Soundtrack 

The music for the film is composed by Thaman S, collaborating with Silambarasan for the third time after Osthe (2011) and Vaalu (2015) and first time collaborated with Suseenthiran. The lyrics for the songs were written by Yugabharathi. Thaman started composing for the film, during the announcement of the release, and completed within a record time of two months. Before the audio release, the first song "Thamizhan Paattu" was served as the film's lead single, which was released on 14 December 2020. The tracklist of the film was released on 2 January 2021, which featured four songs, and the audio was released the very same day, at the Albert Theatre in Chennai.

Reviewing for the soundtrack album for Sify, music critic Siddharth Srinivas gave 3 out of 5, stating "Eeswaran is a nice and effective album from Thaman, who doesn’t go long lengths but still makes it an adequately listenable experience on the whole." A critic from Thandora Times gave 3 out of 5 stating, "Eeswaran has songs that have a commercial film package." Studio Flicks gave 2.5 out of 5 stating "Eeswaran has all the elements of a successful commercial album."

Release 
Eeswaran is scheduled to release on 14 January 2021, coinciding with Pongal. The Tamil Nadu theatrical rights of the film were bought by 7G Films. It was released through video-on-demand, over the new platform OlyFlix, for viewers across overseas countries. Satellite Rights and Digital Rights of the film Acquired by Star India Network.

Reception 
M. Suganth of The Times of India, gave 2.5 out of 5 and stated "The lack of novel ideas, ineffective twists and female leads who have hardly anything to do affect the flow of the film. The emotional scenes lack required intensity, and the tension surrounding the antagonist could have been much better." Srinivasa Ramanujan of The Hindu stated "The Simbu-starrer is yet another village-based tale that has more uncles and relatives than ideas." Behindwoods gave 2.25 out of 5 stating "STR's vintage changeover is promising, but Eeswaran falls short of expectations." Sify gave 2.5 out of 5 and stated "Eeswaran is an average formulaic rural family entertainer."

Ranjani Krishnakumar of Firstpost gave 1.5 out of 5 and stated "In bringing together this colourful and relatable cast of characters, Suseenthiran scores. But that’s that. Once he’s established the milieu, he doesn’t know where to take the film." Ashameera Aiyappan of Cinema Express gave 1.5 out of 5 and stated "It is great that Simbu looks like he has turned back time. But it isn’t great that the film also seems to have travelled back with him." Manoj Kumar R of The Indian Express gave 1 out of 5 stars "Eeswaran is nothing but a two-hour-long verbal and visual flow of cues that reinforce the patriarchal view of women's subservient role to men in a family."

Logesh Balachandran of India Today gave 3.5 out of 5 and wrote "Eeswaran isn't a great film, but director Suseenthiran gets many things right. At a time when fans are longing to witness that energetic Simbu on screen, which has been missing for years now, Suseenthiran delivers a perfect rural entertainer that serves just that. The screenplay has been developed in a manner to please both the star’s fans and family audience. Unlike the actor’s previous films, there is adequate emotion in the script which works big time."

Controversies

Snake issue 
In the motion poster of the film which released on 26 October, the protagonist Silambarasan had a snake wrapped on his neck a forest official filed a case stating that the team had given sedatives to the animal to prevent it from harming the team which kills the animal very soon and also said that many crews are lying telling it is a fake snake. However, the team stated that the snake was a plastic snake and no harm was there for the animal as well as the crew. But a video was released in which Silambarasan practised throwing a snake in a sack bag, but the team said it was a scene in the movie and the snake was a fake one. On 19 November, the Animal Welfare Board of India, objected the film's team to remove the controversial motion poster, which was later removed from YouTube.

Harassment against Suseenthiran 
Director Suseendhiran was involved in controversy over unnecessarily interrupting when Nidhhi Agerwal was speaking in front of public during the audio launch of the film. The director reportedly urged the actress to say that she loves Silambarasan. His distateful behaviour was heavily criticised in the social media for harassing Agerwal in front of public. However the director clarified the controversy stating that he wanted to give the essence to the audience on how the film will work.

100% seating capacity issue in Tamil Nadu 
The film was given permission to release the film with 100% seating capacity in theatres along with Vijay starrer Master (2021) by the Government of Tamil Nadu despite the increase in COVID-19 cases in India especially with cases also increasing in Tamil Nadu. However the Central Government of India issued warrant against Tamil Nadu government's decision to approve the release of the films with full 100% seating capacity. The central government stated that 100% seat occupancy is clearly in violation of the guidelines of MHA which only allows 50% seat occupancy in theatres. Some doctors also cautioned against full seating capacity for the film. Soon after, Central Government notice was passed and it was revoked back to 50% seating capacity in Tamil Nadu theatres.

OTT release issue 
In overseas countries, the makers had signed a deal for the new OTT platform OlyFlix, where the makers will premiere the film through video-on-demand from 14 January 2021 (coincdiing with the release in Indian theatres). However, the Tamil Nadu Theatre Owners Association opposed the decision for a simultaneous OTT release, fearing that piracy sites may upload the high definition print of the film, which will affect the theatrical business. The exhibitors also threatened to boycott the film, if they suggest for an OTT release on the said date. Following pressure from theatre owners and exhibitors, the makers decided to hold the release over video-on-demand, and instead they requested the theatre owners to increase the number of screens for the film.

References

External links

2021 films
2021 action drama films
Indian action drama films
Films directed by Suseenthiran
Films scored by Thaman S
2020s Tamil-language films
Films about the COVID-19 pandemic